Malkowitz may refer to:
 German name of Małkowice, Opole Voivodeship
 Bohaté Málkovice (since 1923: Německé Malkovice), a village and municipality (obec) in Vyškov District in the South Moravian Region of the Czech Republic
 Moravské Málkovice, a village and municipality (obec) in Vyškov District in the South Moravian Region of the Czech Republic

See also 
 Malkovich
 Malkwitz